Ardian Nuhiu (Ardijan Nuhiji, born 7 December 1978 in Skopje) is a retired association footballer and manager born in the Socialist Republic of Macedonia, within the Socialist Federal Republic of Yugoslavia. An ethnic Albanian, he represented Macedonia at the international level.

Playing career
Nuhiji can played as an attacking midfielder or striker.

Club
He had previously played in Republic of Macedonia and in Albania.

International
He made his senior debut for Macedonia in an October 2003 friendly match against Ukraine and has earned a total of 5 caps (2 unofficial), scoring 1 goal. His final international was a November 2005 friendly against Paraguay.

Managerial career
After a retirement, Nuhiji was from 2016 to 2018 a manager of the club where he finished his playing career, FK Shkupi.

References

External links

1978 births
Living people
Footballers from Skopje
Albanian footballers from North Macedonia
Association football midfielders
Macedonian footballers
North Macedonia international footballers
FK Vardar players
FK Sloga Jugomagnat players
FK Rabotnički players
FK Dinamo Tirana players
KF Elbasani players
FK Metalurg Skopje players
Steel Azin F.C. players
Hapoel Acre F.C. players
KF Shkëndija players
FK 11 Oktomvri players
FK Drita players
FK Shkupi players
Macedonian First Football League players
Kategoria Superiore players
Israeli Premier League players
Macedonian Second Football League players
Macedonian expatriate footballers
Expatriate footballers in Iran
Macedonian expatriate sportspeople in Iran
Expatriate footballers in Albania
Macedonian expatriate sportspeople in Albania
Expatriate footballers in Israel
Macedonian expatriate sportspeople in Israel
Macedonian football managers
KF Shkupi managers
FC Drita managers
Macedonian expatriate football managers
Expatriate football managers in Kosovo
Macedonian expatriate sportspeople in Kosovo